Nikos Karouzos was a Greek modernist poet. He was born in Nafplion on 17 July 1926 and died in Athens on 28 September 1990.

He published his first poems in 1949. He also wrote literary criticism and essays on the theatre and art. He was awarded the State Poetry Prize twice, in 1972 and 1988.

External links
Short biography and poems
Homo Graecus, article in the newspaper To Vima, 4 April 1999.
Poems of N.K. in Omada K.
Poems of N.K. in the Center for Neo-Hellenic Studies.

1926 births
1990 deaths
Modern Greek poets
People from Nafplion
20th-century Greek poets